Alidzhoni Ayni (born 6 August 2004) is a Tajikistani professional football player who plays for Tajik club Istiklol, on loan from Russian club Krasnodar-2, and the Tajikistan national team.

Career

Club
During the 2022 summer transfer window, Ayni left Regar-TadAZ for whom he played for during the first half of the 2022 season.

On 11 August 2022, Ayni signed a five-year contract with Russian Premier League club Krasnodar and was initially assigned to the reserves team, Krasnodar-2.

On 18 February 2023, Ayni signed for Istiklol on loan until the end of 2023.

International
In March 2021, Ayni was called up to the Tajikistan national team for the first time, as a replacement for Iskandar Dzhalilov who'd suffered a dislocated foot and fracture lower leg. Ayni subsequently made his senior team debut on 25 March 2021 against Mongolia, coming on as an 85th-minute substitute for Parvizdzhon Umarbayev.

Career statistics

International

Statistics accurate as of match played 8 June 2022

References

2004 births
Living people
Tajikistani footballers
Tajikistan youth international footballers
Tajikistan international footballers
Association football midfielders
FC Krasnodar-2 players
Russian First League players
Tajikistani expatriate footballers
Expatriate footballers in Russia
Tajikistani expatriate sportspeople in Russia